Floraleda Sacchi (June 14, 1978) is an Italian harpist, composer and musicologist born in Como.

Biography
She studied music in Italy, the United States and Canada, with Lisetta Rossi, Alice Giles, Judy Loman, Alice Chalifoux.  
She has won prizes, in Italy and abroad, at 16 music competitions. Between 1998 and 2012 she performed more than 600 concerts in Europe, North and South America, and Asia in concert halls and festivals.

She plays pedal harp (also electro and Celtic harp), as well as historical instruments (single and double action pedal harp).  

She has written articles on musicology related to the harp and harpists. A book by her, entitled Elias Parish Alvars, Life, Music, Documents published in 1999, received the Harpa Award (Prague 1999). She has edited 18th and 19th century harp music, bringing to the public several forgotten composers (such as Sophia Dussek or Alphonse Hasselmans).

She is the author of shows uniting music and acting, including Mystery Tales (for actor, harp and string quartet, dedicated to the relationship among fantasy, horror literature and music) and Travel to the Moon (for actor, harp and planetarium - presented regularly at Milan's Planetarium) - freely inspired from Cosmicomiche by Italo Calvino. Beginning in June 2007, she played live in Ottavia Piccolo's monologue Donna non rieducabile. The show, based on a text by Stefano Massini, is dedicated to journalist Anna Politkovskaya. The show was made into a film by Felice Cappa in 2009. The movie was produced by RAI TV with the title "Il sangue, la neve" (The Blood, the Snow). Published by PromoMusic in DVD, the movie was presented at the 66th Venice Film Festival.

Since 2006, Floraleda Sacchi has been the artistic director of the Lake Como Festival.

Audio file
 (live recording)
Krumpholtz: Sonata op. 8 n. 1 (2. Romance très lente). Floraleda Sacchi (Harp), Claudio Ferrarini (Flute) (live recording)

Video
Live performances by Floraleda Sacchi

Publications
Elias Parish Alvars, Life, Music, Documents: annotated catalogue of his works for harp, piano, orchestra and voice, Odilia Publishing, 1999 - . 220 pag, 40 ill.
"Specchio", a poem with artworks by Cristoforo Mantegazza. Pulcino Elefante Editions, February 2004
"Violette", a poem with artworks by Cristoforo Mantegazza. Pulcino Elefante Editions, February 2004

Link
Official website www.floraledasacchi.com
YouTube Channel
Italian page on Wikipedia
German page on Wikipedia

Italian classical harpists
Italian musicologists
1978 births
Living people
People from Como